Alfred E. Treibs (1899–1983) was a German organic chemist who is credited with founding the area of organic geochemistry.  He received his PhD under Hans Fischer at the Technical University of Munich.  Fischer had received the Nobel Prize in Chemistry for elucidating the structures of porphyrins.  

In the 1930s Treibs discovered metalloporphyrins in petroleum.  These porphyrins resemble chlorophylls.  This discovery helped confirm the biological origin of petroleum, which was previously controversial.

References

External links
List of recipients of the Alfred Treibs Award

1899 births
1983 deaths
20th-century German chemists
Technical University of Munich alumni
Academic staff of the Technical University of Munich